Maung Myo Thant (born 1922) was a Burmese boxer. He competed in the men's flyweight event at the 1948 Summer Olympics.

References

External links
 

1922 births
Possibly living people
Burmese male boxers
Olympic boxers of Myanmar
Boxers at the 1948 Summer Olympics
Place of birth missing
Flyweight boxers